The Roman Catholic Diocese of Pasig is the diocese of the Latin Church of the Catholic Church in the Philippines that comprises the cities of Pasig and Taguig, and the municipality of Pateros, in Metro Manila, Philippines. It was established by Pope John Paul II on June 28, 2003, by virtue of the papal bull Dei Caritas. It was formally and canonically erected on August 21, 2003, with the installation of Francisco C. San Diego as its first bishop. The Immaculate Conception Cathedral-Parish, located in the central vicinity of Pasig, was made the cathedral or the seat of the diocese.

Historical background
Prior to the establishment as a local church, the present-day Diocese of Pasig used to be a part of the Archdiocese of Manila (largely under the Ecclesiastical District of Makati). The Vicariate of Santo Tomas de Villanueva was then under the Diocese of Antipolo. The oldest parishes, built during the Spanish colonialization period, were in Pasig (Immaculate Conception), Pateros (San Roque), and Taguig (Saint Anne). In 1953, the community of Santolan, Pasig was granted a parish of their own, Santo Tomas de Villanueva Parish, which was followed by the establishment of new parishes in Rosario and Bicutan (1963), Tipas and Bagong Ilog (1969), and Barrio Capitolyo (1976). The northeastern side of Pasig, which comprises the barangays of Manggahan, Santolan, De La Paz, Santa Lucia, and Rosario, was given to the newly established Diocese of Antipolo in 1983. Between 1985 and 1995, six chapels of the Immaculate Conception Parish were elevated as independent parishes.

Parishes belonging to the Vicariate of the Immaculate Conception and to the municipalities of Taguig and Pateros were part of the Ecclesiastical District of Makati, which was then headed by Manila Auxiliary Bishop Crisostomo Yalung. In October 2001, these parishes were carved out to form the new Ecclesiastical District of Pasig, with Nestor Cariño, then Secretary-General of the Catholic Bishops' Conference of the Philippines (now bishop-emeritus of Legazpi), as its first district bishop. Between the years 2000 and 2003, in preparation for the erection of the new diocese, some juridical changes to the district took place. Barangays San Antonio and Oranbo, which formerly belonged to Saint Francis of Assisi Parish in Mandaluyong, were turned over to Holy Family Parish. The military chapel of Our Lady of the Assumption in Fort Bonifacio was turned over by the Military Ordinariate to the Archdiocese of Manila in 2000 and was renamed Saint Michael Chaplaincy. Saint Joseph Chapel in Upper Bicutan, Taguig, which belonged to San Martin de Porres Parish in Parañaque City, became an independent parish under the District of Pasig in 2002.

On June 28, 2003, few months after carving out the dioceses of Paranaque and Novaliches from the Archdiocese of Manila, Pope John Paul II decreed the erection of three more new dioceses in response to the surging pastoral needs of the faithful of the archdiocese. With the promulgation of the papal bull Dei Caritas, the Pope officially established the new Diocese of Pasig and appointed Francisco Capiral San Diego, then bishop of San Pablo, Laguna, as its first bishop. The Vicariate of Santo Tomas de Villanueva was separated from the Diocese of Antipolo to be included in the new diocese. The diocese was canonically erected on August 21, 2003, with the installation of Bishop San Diego in the presence of the Apostolic Nuncio, Archbishop Antonio Franco, Manila Archbishop Cardinal Jaime Sin, and the bishops gracing the occasion. Bishop San Diego named the district's episcopal vicar, Rodolfo Gallardo, as the first vicar general, Roy Rosales as the first chancellor, Pedro Enrique Rabonza IV as judicial vicar, Amando Litana as superintendent of Catholic schools, and Manuel Gabriel as the diocesan pastoral director.

In December 2003, Msgr. Gallardo was installed second rector of the Immaculate Conception Cathedral-Parish. After he retired as vicar-general and cathedral rector in February 2005, he was succeeded by Bishop San Diego as acting parish priest and rector. The bishop named Ramil Marcos, his private secretary and vice-chancellor, as the second vicar general of the diocese and Roy Rosales as the fourth rector of the cathedral. In 2006, he appointed Orlando Cantillon as the new vicar general.

During his term, Bishop San Diego worked for the improvement of the Catholic cemetery and the construction of the bishop's residence and diocesan offices within the vicinity of the cathedral. He started a retirement plan fund for the clergy and summoned a general pastoral assembly for lay leaders in the diocese. Due to the shortage of parish priests, he entrusted a number of parishes to guest priests as priests-in-charge or administrators. His term was marked by the papal canonical coronation of the image of Our Lady of the Immaculate Conception of Pasig in the cathedral on December 7, 2008, the solemn declaration of San Roque Parish in Pateros as the Diocesan Shrine of Santa Marta on February 7, 2009, and the establishment of Tanyag Chapel, which belonged to Sagrada Familia Parish, as a quasi-parish (Our Mother of Perpetual Help Quasi-Parish) on September 8, 2010.

On December 21, 2010, Pope Benedict XVI accepted San Diego's retirement as bishop and named Manila Archbishop Cardinal Gaudencio Rosales as concurrent apostolic administrator of the diocese. On April 20, 2011, the Pope appointed Mylo Hubert Claudio Vergara, bishop of San Jose, Nueva Ecija, as the second bishop of Pasig. During his term, Bishop Vergara strengthened the lay evangelization programs in the diocese, invited some religious orders to administer a number of parishes in the diocese, and oversaw the inauguration of the Tahanan ng Mabuting Pastol (House of Good Shepherd) Building within the vicinity of Santa Clara de Montefalco Parish to house the new bishop's residence and diocesan offices on April 24, 2017. On September 15, 2012, he established San Vicente Ferrer Quasi-Parish in Palar Village, Barangay Pinagsama, C-5, Taguig City and later elevated Our Mother of Perpetual Help Quasi-Parish in Bagong Tanyag (2015), St. Michael the Archangel Chaplaincy in Fort Bonifacio (2017), and St. Vincent Ferrer Quasi-Parish in Palar (2018) to full-fledged parochial status.

Clergy

Bishop of Pasig

Vicar-General
The vicar-general assists the bishop in the administrative duties over the diocese. Since the time of Ramil Marcos, the vicar-general serves also as adviser for the diocesan seminarians.

(Lt. Col.) Msgr. Rodolfo A. Gallardo (2003 to 2005)
Fr. Ramil R. Marcos (2005 to 2006)
Fr. Orlando B. Cantillon (2006–present)

Board of Consultors
Priests with key positions to the diocese, as of February 22, 2021, are as follows:

Bishop – Most Rev. Mylo Hubert C. Vergara
Vicar General – Fr. Orlando B. Cantillon (preceded by Ramil R. Marcos)
Moderator Curiae - Fr. Mariano L. Baranda
Episcopal Vicar for the Clergy – Fr. Amando N. Litana
Episcopal Vicar for Guest Priests – Fr. Renier N. Llorca (preceded by Paulino G. Balagtas)
Judicial Vicar – Fr. Vicente R. Uy, JCD
Chancellor – Fr. Joeffrey Brian V. Catuiran, JCD
Oeconomus (Treasurer) – Fr. Orlindo F. Ordoña
Superintendent of Catholic Schools – Fr. Daniel L. Estacio

Presbyteral Council
Ex Officio Members – all the members of the Board of Consultors
Permanent Members (Vicars Forane)
    Vicariate of the Immaculate Conception – Fr. Mariano Baranda
    Vicariate of Santo Tomas de Villanueva – Fr. Reynaldo Reyes
    Vicariate of Saint Anne – Fr. Loreto Sanchez Jr.
    Vicariate of Santo Niño – Fr. Orlindo Ordoña
    Other Members: 
    Fr. Glenn Gaabucayan
    Fr. Reynaldo Reyes
    Fr. Joselito Jopson
    Fr. Hernandez Mendoza
    Fr. Adriano Amores, Jr.
    Fr. Edmond Reynaldo
    Fr. Arnold Eramiz
    Fr. Jorge Jesus Bellosillo
    Fr. Emmanuel Hipolito
    Fr. Rodolfo Paragas

Diocesan commissions and ministries
Below is the list of priests who chair the respective diocesan ministries or commissions.

Basic Ecclesial Communities - Fr. Joselito Jopson
BIblical Apostolate - Fr. Reynaldo Reyes
Caritas Pasig, Inc. - Fr. Edmond Reynaldo
Cultural Heritage of the Church - Fr. Roy Rosales
Diocesan Council for the Laity - Fr. Orlando Cantillon
Exorcism - Fr. Daniel Estacio
Ecology - Fr. Edmond Reynaldo
Ecumenism and Inter-Faith Dialogue - Fr. Reynaldo Reyes
Catechetics - Fr. Bernardo Carpio
Family and Life - Fr. Darwin Calderon
Healthcare - Fr. Glenn Gaabucayan
Liturgical Affairs - Fr. Roberto Carlo Okol
Diocesan Marian Council - Fr. Renier Llorca
Religious Congregations and Institutes - Fr. Adriano Amores
Migrants and Itinerant People - Fr. Jorge Jesus Bellosillo
Mission Apostolate - Fr. Rodolfo Paragas Jr.
Parish Pastoral Council for Responsible Voting - Fr. Loreto Sanchez Jr.
Pastoral Formation - Fr. Edgardo Barrameda
Pondo ng Pinoy (Pasig) - Fr. Edmond Reynaldo
Prison - Fr. Hernandez Mendoza Jr.
Renewal/Charismatic Movements - Fr. Emmanuel Hipolito
Social Communications - Fr. Joselito I. Jopson
Social Services Development Ministry - Fr. Edmond Reynaldo
Ugnayan ng Barangay at Simbahan - Fr. Loreto Sanchez Jr.
Vocation - Fr. Loreto Sanchez Jr.
Youth Affairs - Fr. Joeffrey Brian Catuiran

Statistics
The Diocese of Pasig had 1,306,505 baptized Catholics, representing 82.7 percent of all 1,580,225 people in the territory (as of March 2008). In 2006, the diocese recorded 36,475 baptisms and had 725 catechumens.

References

Bishop Vergara is Pasig's 2nd Bishop

Pasig Diocese Bishop San Diego Installed (from Manila Bulletin, August 21, 2003)
Updated Diocese of Pasig Directory from the Office of the Chancellor

External links
A Video Presentation of the Diocese of Pasig (SCS)
Diocese of Pasig (Catholic Hierarchy)
Unofficial Blogsite of the Diocese of Pasig (by Fr. Joselito I. Jopson)
Pasig Suffragan Diocese – RCAM link 
Diocese of Pasig (GCatholic.org)
UCANEWS Pasig Diocesan Profile
Schedule of the Canonical Shrinehood of the Church of Pateros (provided by the website of the Municipality of Pateros) 

Pasig
Christian organizations established in 2003
Roman Catholic dioceses in the Philippines
Roman Catholic Ecclesiastical Province of Manila
Roman Catholic dioceses and prelatures established in the 21st century